Ashwaubenon High School is a public high school located in Ashwaubenon, Wisconsin. A community pool and performing arts center are also housed within the school.

History
In 2008, the school made national and international headlines after it was discovered that a 33-year old mother of two named Wendy Anne Brown had disguised herself as her teenage daughter and enrolled as a sophomore, attending classes for one day and being admitted to the cheerleading program before being caught by the police and charged with identity theft. Diagnosed with bipolar II disorder, posttraumatic stress disorder, borderline personality disorder, avoidant personality disorder and paranoid personality disorder, the court found her “not guilty by reason of mental disease.”  The story was later adapted into a 2019 Lifetime movie entitled Identity Theft of a Cheerleader, starring Maiara Walsh, Karis Cameron, Jesse Irving, Naika Toussaint, Chiara Guzzo, Matty Finochio, Bzhaun Rhoden, and Gail O'Grady.

In 2017, the school again made national headlines after a parent who thought a student dressed as a stormtrooper from Star Wars for May the Fourth (Star Wars Day) was a threat to the school, resulting in an evacuation. A nearby middle school and community center were also placed on lockdown during the incident.

Academics
Ashwaubenon High School offers Advanced Placement (AP) classes, which about a third of students take.

Demographics
AHS is 79 percent white, 6 percent Hispanic, 4 percent Native American, three percent black, and two percent Asian. Six percent of students identify as a part of two or more races.

Athletics
The Ashwaubenon Jaguar football team won the WIAA Division 2 state championship in 1996, 2000, 2001, and 2008. The softball team won four Division 1 state championships, in 1992, 1993, 1994, and 2006.

Extracurricular activities

The AHS marching band performed at the 2001 Tournament of Roses Parade and the St. Patrick's Day Parade in New York.

A referendum-funded $8 million performing arts center at the high school opened in fall of 2016, hosting music and drama events from the school as well as other community performances.

The Jaguaress dance team claimed a Division 1 kick championship in 2018, and Division 2 kick and pom championships in 2019.

Ashwaubenon's Nordic skiing team won the 2020 state championship.

AHS has a competitive show choir, "Encore".

Notable alumni
Mason Appleton, professional ice hockey forward
Joel Hodgson (1978), writer, television producer, and creator of Mystery Science Theater 3000
Adam Koch (2006), basketball player
James Morgan (2015) American football quarterback
Aaron Stecker, NFL running back
Mike Taylor (2008), professional football player
Christian Wolanin (2013), NHL player

References

External links
Ashwaubenon High School

Schools in Brown County, Wisconsin
Educational institutions established in 1965
Public high schools in Wisconsin
1965 establishments in Wisconsin